Larrinbe is a village and council located in the municipality of Amurrio, in Álava province, Basque Country, Spain. As of 2020, it has a population of 246.

Geography 
Larrimbe is located 39 km northwest of Vitoria-Gasteiz.

References

Populated places in Álava